Presidente João Figueiredo Airport  is the airport serving Sinop, Brazil. It is named after João Baptista de Oliveira Figueiredo, the 30th President of Brazil.

It is operated by Aeroeste.

History
On March 15, 2019 Aeroeste won a 30-year concession to operate the airport.

Airlines and destinations

Accidents and incidents
26 August 1993: a TAM Meridionais Cessna 208A Caravan I registration PT-OGN was hijacked and set on fire after landing at Sinop. There were no victims.

Access

See also

List of airports in Brazil

References

External links

Airports in Mato Grosso